The Mike O'Malley Show is an American sitcom on NBC that aired two episodes. The series star, Mike O'Malley, created and executive produced the series with Les Firestein.

Synopsis
Mike (Mike O'Malley), a 30-year-old hockey enthusiast who lives with his friend Weasel (Mark Rosenthal) in New Haven, Connecticut. After attending the wedding of his friend Jimmy (Will Arnett), Mike begins to reassess his life and decides it's time to grow up.

Before the series hit the air, the pilot was retaped when it was panned by critics. Upon airing, the series received bad reviews and low ratings. After airing two episodes of the thirteen produced, NBC canceled the series.

Cast
 Mike O'Malley as Mike
 Mark Rosenthal as Weasel
 Will Arnett as Jimmy Nelson
 Kate Walsh as Marcia 
 Missy Yager as Shawna
 Kerry O'Malley as Kerry

Episodes

References

External links
  
 

1999 American television series debuts
1999 American television series endings
1990s American sitcoms
English-language television shows
NBC original programming
Television series by Universal Television
Television shows set in Connecticut